Dickinson–Milbourn House is a historic home located near Jonesville, Lee County, Virginia.  It was built between 1844 and 1848, and is a two-story, five-bay, gable roofed brick dwelling. It has a  central passage plan and a pair of semi-exterior end brick chimneys at each gable end. Also on the property is the contributing large brick smokehouse.

It was listed on the National Register of Historic Places in 1993.

References

Houses on the National Register of Historic Places in Virginia
Houses completed in 1848
Houses in Lee County, Virginia
National Register of Historic Places in Lee County, Virginia